Shaheed Keshvani (born 23 May 1984) is a Canadian cricketer. He has played five One Day Internationals (ODIs) and two Twenty20 Internationals for Canada. He plays as a middle-order batsman, and bats right-handed.

References

External links
 

1984 births
Living people
Canadian cricketers
Canada One Day International cricketers
Canada Twenty20 International cricketers
Place of birth missing (living people)
Canadian people of Indian descent